Mirina fenzeli is a moth of the family Endromidae. It is found from Sichuan to the mountains of central China.

References 

Moths described in 1938
Endromidae